Park Tunnel may refer to:

 Park Tunnel, Nottingham, a road and later a pedestrian tunnel in Nottingham, England
 Phoenix Park Tunnel, a railway tunnel in Dublin, Ireland.
 Victoria Park Tunnel, a motorway tunnel in Auckland, New Zealand,

See also 

 Park Avenue Tunnel (disambiguation)